A kinase anchor protein 1, mitochondrial is an enzyme that in humans is encoded by the AKAP1 gene.

Function 

The A-kinase anchor proteins (AKAPs) are a group of structurally diverse proteins that have the common function of binding to the regulatory subunit of protein kinase A (PKA) and confining the holoenzyme to discrete locations within the cell. This gene encodes a member of the AKAP family. The encoded protein binds to type I and type II regulatory subunits of PKA and anchors them to the mitochondrion. This protein is speculated to be involved in the cAMP-dependent signal transduction pathway and in directing RNA to a specific cellular compartment.

Interactions 

AKAP1 has been shown to interact with:

 C3orf15, 
 MYCBP, 
 PRKAR1A, 
 PRKAR1B, and
 PRKAR2A.

References

External links

Further reading

A-kinase-anchoring proteins